

Belgium
Belgian Congo – Eugène Jungers, Governor-General of the Belgian Congo (1947–1951)

France
 French Somaliland – Paul Henri Siriex, Governor of French Somaliland (1946–1950)
 Guinea – Édouard Louis Terrac, Governor of Guinea (1946–1948)

Portugal
 Angola – 
 Vasco Lopes Alves, High Commissioner of Angola (1943–1947)
 Fernando Falcão Pacheco Mena, High Commissioner of Angola (1947)
 Temporarily vacant (1947–1948)

Republic of China
 Taiwan – Chen Yi, Governor-General of Taiwan (25 October 1945 – May 1947)

United Kingdom
 Aden – Sir Reginald Stuart Champion, Governor of Aden (1945–1950)
 Malta Colony – Francis Douglas, Governor of Malta (1946–1949)
 Northern Rhodesia 
 Sir Eubule John Waddington, Governor of Northern Rhodesia (1941–1947)
 Robert Stanley, acting Governor of Northern Rhodesia (1947–1948)

Colonial governors
Colonial governors
1947